Nemegos station is a Via Rail flag stop station located at Nemegos, Ontario in the Unorganized North Part of Sudbury District in Northeastern Ontario, Canada. It is on the Canadian Pacific Railway (CPR) transcontinental main line, and is served by the regional rail Sudbury – White River train.

Nemegos was established in the 1890s as a sectional point on the CPR between the divisional points of Chapleau to the west and Cartier to the east.

References

External links

Via Rail stations in Ontario
Railway stations in Sudbury District
Canadian Pacific Railway stations in Ontario